Chance-constrained portfolio selection is an approach to portfolio selection under Loss aversion. 
The formulation assumes that investor’s preferences are representable by the expected utility of final wealth, and that they require to be acceptably low, the probability of their final wealth falling below a survival or safety level.
The chance-constrained portfolio problem is then to find:
Max wjE(Xj), subject to Pr( wjXj < s) ≤ , wj = 1, wj ≥ 0 for all j,

The original implementation is based on the seminal work of Abraham Charnes and William W. Cooper on stochastic programming in 1959,

and was first applied to finance by Bertil Naslund and Andrew B. Whinston in 1962
 
and in 1969 by N. H. Agnew, et al. 

For fixed  the chance-constrained portfolio problem represents Lexicographic preferences and is an implementation of capital asset pricing under loss aversion.

For a comparison to mean-variance and safety-first portfolio problems, see; for a survey of solution methods here, see; for a discussion of the risk aversion properties of chance-constrained portfolio selection, see

See also
Portfolio optimization
Loss aversion
Stochastic programming
Expected utility theory
Lexicographic preferences
Capital asset pricing model
Post modern portfolio theory

References

Portfolio theories
Stochastic optimization
Financial economics
Actuarial science